BAIC Foton Motor Co., Ltd., known as Foton Motor or Foton, is a Chinese company that designs and manufactures trucks, buses and sport utility vehicles . It is headquartered in Changping, Beijing, and is a subsidiary of the BAIC Group.

History
Founded on August 28, 1996, Foton manufactures light and heavy-duty trucks, agricultural tractors, and various other machinery. Foton International Trade Co., Ltd, Beijing, is Foton Motor Group's international sales subsidiary.

In addition to the heavier trucks, Foton also builds a car inspired by the Toyota HiAce H100, called the "Foton View" or "Foton Alpha".

In August 2002, the company started producing Foton Auman truck.

In March 2006 Foton and Cummins Inc. announced the creation of a 50:50 joint venture company, Beijing Foton Cummins Engine Company (BFCEC), to produce light-duty diesel engines, of 2.8 and 3.8 liter displacement.

In October 2009 Foton agreed to form a joint venture to develop and produce vehicle batteries with Pulead Technology Industry Co.

In July 2010 Foton announced the establishment of a European headquarters in Moscow, Russia.

Foton established a sales company in India in April 2011.

In February 2012, Beiqi Foton Motors Co., Ltd. and Daimler AG established a 50-50 joint venture, Beijing Foton Daimler Automotive Co., Ltd., at an investment of RMB6.35 billion. The joint venture would take over Foton's existing Auman medium- and heavy-duty truck business, including production sites, sales and service network.

Foton will build an assembly plant in Colombia, in order to participate in the growing Latin American market for light commercial vehicles. The company also plans to build a plant in Western Maharashtra, India.

Foton has announced a bus factory in Brazil in the state of Bahia, as part of their globalization plan. Foton has held a press conference in 2015, previewing the Sauvana while announcing news to bring the brand to the United States.

In September 2017 Foton and Piaggio agreed to form a joint venture to develop and produce light commercial vehicle. Based on Foton chassis the new vehicle was sold by Piaggio Commercial Vehicle division in Europe and in all market around the world but not in China. The vehicle was intended as a successor of the Piaggio Porter and production was planned to starts in the mid 2019 in Pontedera (Italy) with all components produced by Foton in China.

In August 2018, Foton Motor announced they would set up a plant in Bangladesh by next year to assemble commercial vehicles in a joint venture with ACI Motors

In 25 April 2019 Foton and CP has announced a truck factory in Thailand name CP FOTON SALES CO., LTD. Now have the electric truck name Auman EST, AUMARK and AUV.

Operations

Foton is headquartered in Changping District, Beijing. Foton's business units are seen in cities and provinces such as Beijing, Tianjin, Shandong, Hebei, Hunan, Hubei, Liaoning, and Guangdong. Its R&D branches are distributed in India, Japan, Germany, Taiwan and the Philippines. It has assets exceeding 50 billion Yuan and 300,000 employees. Foton, whose brand value exceeds 61.932 billion Yuan in 2005, ranked No.1 in auto industry and No. 11 in the “Top 500 Most Valuable Brands”.

Foton business marquee also consists of a branch in Ulaanbaatar, Mongolia. Och motors LLC, is one of the biggest conglomerate in Mongolia, is the official distributor of Foton in Mongolian market.

North Korea
Foton manufactures vehicles in Hanghang district, Pyongyang in the Samhung Joint Venture Company factory, Foton Vehicles in North Korea are sold under the Chonji Marque.

Products

Buses

Foton AUV (福田欧辉)
 Foton AUV New Directions (since 2000; Original name:新干线欧V)
 Foton AUV panoramic Unlimited (since 2003; Original name:全景无限)
 Foton AUV Pioneer Europe (since 1998; Original name:欧V先锋)Brand name
 Foton Green Earth (Using city bus in Gangneung, South Korea. It was introduced in 2018 Pyeongchang Olympics.)

Trucks

Foton Auman
 Foton Auman Jones (Original name:欧曼奇兵)
 Foton Auman Lion (Original name:欧曼雄狮)
 Foton Auman Kunlun Mountains (Original name:欧曼昆仑)
 Foton Auman Shenzhou (Original name:欧曼神舟)
 Foton Auman H4 (since 2011)
 Foton Auman EST

Foton Aumark (欧马可)
 Foton Aumark (since 2005, Original name:欧马可)
 Foton Aumark C
 Foton Aumark S
 Foton Aumark Flex

Foton Forland (时代汽车)
 Foton Forland (Since 2006,  Original name:时代轻卡)
 Foton Forland King Kong (since 1998 under license of a South American VW trucks; Original name:时代金刚)
 Foton Forland Ruiwo (since 1998 under license of a South American VW trucks; Original name:瑞沃)

Foton Ollin (奥铃)
 Foton Ollin Beyond (since 2005, Original name:奥铃超越)
 Foton Ollin MRI (since 2005, Original name:奥铃捷运)

Passenger vehicles
Gratour MPVs (北京伽途)
Gratour im6 (智爱MPV)
Gratour im8 (智美运动家庭车)
Gratour ix5 (1501cc;since 2016) (智行MPV)
Gratour ix7 (1507cc;since 2016) (智趣S—MPV)

Foton Sauvana SUV (萨瓦纳) (since 2014; also known as Foton Toplander) 

Foton Tunland (拓陆者) pickup 
 Foton Tunland E3
 Foton Tunland E5
 Foton Tunland S

Foton Tunland Yutu (拓陆者 驭途) pickup
 Foton Tunland Yutu 8
 Foton Tunland Yutu 9
Foton General F9 (福田 将军 F9 pickup)
Foton Grand General G7 (福田 大将军 G7 pickup)
Foton Grand General G9 (福田 大将军 G9 pickup)

Foton Mars (火星) pickup 
 Foton Mars 7 (福田 火星7 pickup)
 Foton Mars 9 (福田 火星9 pickup)

Foton Saga (since 2004 under license of DangDong -terrain vehicle; Original name:福田传奇)(Discontinued)

Foton SUP (since 2004 pickup based on the Saga; Original name:萨普)

Light commercial vehicles

Foton MP-X (MP-X蒙派克) MPV
 Foton MP-X Parker Mongolia (since 2005; Original name: MP-X蒙派克) 
Foton View (福田风景)
 Foton View G9 (since 2004 heavily resembling the Toyota HiAce as the high top version)
 Foton View G7 (Also known as CS2; since 2004 under license of the Toyota HiAce as the low top version) 
 Foton View V5 compact MPV
 Foton View V3  microvan

Foton Toano (since 2015) business class van/ minibus

Foton Xiangling (Original name:祥菱) light truck series (Discontinued)
 Foton Xiangling M
 Foton Xiangling V

Foton Midi (Discontinued)

Foton View Express (produced from 2001 to 2012 resembling the Toyota HiAce, Original name:风景快运)Foton View Express Passenger (produced from 2000 to 2006 resembling the Toyota HiAce, Original name:风景快客)Foton View Ireland Act (produced from 1999 to 2005 resembling the Toyota HiAce, Original name:风景爱尔法)

Foton Zhilan (Smart Smurf)
Foton Smart Smurf E5/ E7

Foton Rowor (Original name:瑞沃) trucks

Light trucks
 Foton Rowor Xiaojingang 
 Foton Rowor E3
 Foton Rowor Dajingang 1
 Foton Rowor Dajingang 3

Heavy trucks
 Foton Rowor ES3
 Foton Rowor ES5
 Foton Rowor ES7
 Foton Rowor Q5
 Foton Rowor Q9
 Foton Rowor Dajingang ES3
 Foton Rowor Dajingang ES5

Sales
Foton Motor sold a total of 640,400 vehicles in 2011.

References

External links

Foton official website 
Foton official website  
UK Supplier of Foton tractors 

BAIC Group divisions and subsidiaries
Truck manufacturers of China
Manufacturing companies based in Beijing
Vehicle manufacturing companies established in 1996
Chinese companies established in 1996
Chinese brands